The District Court of Queensland (QDC) is the second tier in the court hierarchy of Queensland, Australia. The Court deals with serious criminal offences such as rape, armed robbery and fraud. Juries are used to decide if defendants are guilty or not guilty.

The original court was established in 1866 to ease the workload of the Supreme Court of Queensland. However, in 1921 the Queensland Parliament decided District Courts were no longer necessary and the courts were abolished. They were re-established by Parliament in 1958, again to relieve the workload in the Supreme Court. The present court is constituted under the District Court of Queensland Act 1967 (Qld).  That Act amalgamated the previous District Court in existence prior to 1967 into the new District Court.

The District Court sits in 32 locations across Queensland. Judges also travel throughout the state to hear matters in regional and remote areas.

Decisions made by the District Court may be heard on appeal to the Supreme Court; and the District Court may sit as an appellate court for decisions made in the Magistrates Court of Queensland. The unreported judgments of the District Courts is published on the Queensland Judgments website.

Jurisdiction

Civil
The District Court has jurisdiction to hear civil matters for which the amount in dispute is less than or equal to $750,000, and more than $150,000. Civil disputes in which the amount in dispute is more than $750,000 are heard by the Supreme Court, while those in which the amount is $150,000 or less are heard by either the Magistrates Court or the Queensland Civil and Administrative Tribunal. District Court civil decisions are published on the Queensland Judgments website.

Criminal
The District Court has the jurisdiction to hear criminal matters in which the defendant has been charged with a serious indictable offence (such as armed robbery, rape, and dangerous driving). These trials require a jury. District Court criminal decisions are published on the Queensland Judgments website.

Composition

Chief Judge of the District Court

Judges of the District Court
The District Court operates permanent courts in Brisbane, located in the Queen Elizabeth II Courts of Law building on George Street, Brisbane CBD; and Cairns, Ipswich, Maroochydore, Rockhampton, Southport, Townsville, and sits in regional areas as required. In Brisbane, the District Court shares the location with the Supreme Court.

, the judges who sat at the District Court, together with their location, were:

See also

 Australian court hierarchy
 Judiciary of Australia
 List of Queensland courts and tribunals

References

Queensland courts and tribunals
1866 establishments in Australia
 
1921 disestablishments in Australia
1958 establishments in Australia
Courts and tribunals established in 1866
Courts and tribunals disestablished in 1921
Courts and tribunals established in 1958